Negru Vodă (historical names: Caraomer) is a town in Constanța County, Northern Dobruja, south-eastern Romania. The town is close to the border with Bulgaria and there is a border crossing linking Negru Vodă to the Bulgarian village Kardam. It officially became a town in 1989, as a result of the Romanian rural systematization program.

The name is probably derived from the legendary Radu Negru (also known as Negru Vodă, the "Black Prince"), founder and ruler of Wallachia.

Administration
The following villages are administered by the town of Negru Vodă:
 Darabani (historical names: Daulchioi)
 Vâlcele (historical names: Valalî)

Demographics

At the 2011 census, Negru Vodă had 4,698 Romanians (95.24%), 160 Roma (3.24%), 43 Turks (0.87%), 28 Tatars (0.57%), 4 others (0.08%).

Gallery

References

Towns in Romania
Populated places in Constanța County
Localities in Northern Dobruja
Bulgaria–Romania border crossings